Donna Kimberley Brown (born 2 July 1982) is a former Australian cricketer who is a left-handed opening batter. Born in Bacchus Marsh, Victoria, she represented Western Australia in 19 List A matches during three seasons (2007/08–2009/10) of the Women's National Cricket League (WNCL).

References

External links
 
 

1982 births
Living people
Australian cricketers
Australian women cricketers
Cricketers from Victoria (Australia)
Sportswomen from Victoria (Australia)
Western Australia women cricketers
People from Bacchus Marsh